Sanhedria HaMurhevet (also spelled Sanhedria HaMurchevet) is a Haredi neighborhood in Jerusalem.  Its name translates as "expanded Sanhedria".

The neighborhood was founded in 1970 as a northern expansion of Sanhedria. The neighborhood is horseshoe-shaped. As of 2007 it has 784 residences. The neighborhood is closed to automobile traffic on Shabbat and Jewish holidays.

Sanhedria Murhevet is home to Yeshivat Tiferet Zvi, Yeshiva Toras Moshe, Yeshiva Chofetz Chaim, the Jerusalem Kollel, and Kollel Meshech Chochma. The Har Hotzvim industrial complex and Yeshivat Horev are located nearby.

Nahal Tzofim
The neighborhood overlooks Nahal Tzofim which is a tributary of Nahal Sorek. The slope on the southern bank of Nahal Tzofim, which the neighborhood overlooks, is an open area with many terraces constructed during the Second Temple period, used for agriculture in antiquity. Other artifacts of antique agriculture, such as threshing-stones and cisterns, and burial caves, continue along the creek's path.

Notable residents 
 Asher Arieli
 Haim Bar-Lev
 Yitzchak Berkovits
 Uri Lupolianski
 Yitzhak Yosef

External links

 Yad Sarah homepage 

Neighbourhoods of Jerusalem
Israeli settlements in East Jerusalem